Mullen School District or Mullen Public Schools is a school district headquartered in Mullen, Nebraska. It operates two well established schools: Mullen Elementary School and Mullen High School.

References

External links
 Mullen Public Schools
School districts in Nebraska
Hooker County, Nebraska